2,2,3,3-Tetrafluoropropyl trifluoromethyl ether is a fluorinated ether with convulsant action.

See also
Flurothyl

References

Convulsants
Organofluorides
Trifluoromethyl ethers